John Peter Kaj Harryson (born 2 April 1948) is a Swedish actor, singer and entertainer. He is the son of actor John Harryson (1926–2008). From 1994 until 2001, Harryson played antagonist Pehr Silver in the soap opera Rederiet. He is also known from hosting the game show Så ska det låta. In the 1980s, he worked extensively with dubbing cartoons into Swedish. Three of his most famous roles are that of pilot Roy Focker in the Swedish dub of the film Macross: Do You Remember Love? , Shaggy Rogers in the Scooby-Doo-series, and Ernie in Svenska Sesam (The second Swedish version of Sesame Street).

External links

1948 births
Living people
Swedish male television actors
Swedish male voice actors
Swedish male singers
Swedish entertainers